Huddersfield Town's 1948–49 campaign is referred to in Town folklore as the original "Great Escape" season (the second being the 1997–98 season), when Arnold Rodgers scored the goal that saw Town maintain their 1st Division status. His goal against Manchester City, with 10 minutes of the last match of the season remaining saw Town keep their status and relegate Preston North End and Sheffield United in the process.

Squad at the start of the season

Review
Town's fortunes during the season didn't seem to improve on the previous season. Even the 14 goals from veteran Peter Doherty didn't seem to pull Town away from almost certain relegation. Relegation seemed to be certain for 2 out of Town, Preston North End and Sheffield United. With 10 minutes of Town's last match at home against Manchester City seemed to be heading down the trapdoor to Division 2.

But, an uncharacteristic error by legendary goalkeeper Frank Swift gave Arnold Rodgers the chance to score, which he did. Town won 1–0 which relegated Preston & Sheffield United and meant Town would live to fight another day.

Squad at the end of the season

Results

Division One

FA Cup

Appearances and goals

1948-49
English football clubs 1948–49 season